The 1900 Missouri gubernatorial election was held on November 6, 1900 and resulted in a victory for the Democratic nominee, former Congressman Alexander Monroe Dockery, over the Republican candidate Joseph Flory and several other candidates representing minor parties.

Results

References

Missouri
1900
Gubernatorial
November 1900 events